Safiya Said Khalid (born 1996) is a Somali-American politician who served as a member of the Lewiston, Maine City Council.

Early years and education 
Khalid was born in Somalia. As a seven-year-old, Khalid fled the country with her mother and two younger brothers. Her family initially settled in New Jersey before moving to Lewiston, Maine. At fourteen years old, she became an American citizen. She attended Lewiston Public Schools and graduated from Lewiston High School. Khalid went on to graduate from the University of Southern Maine, where she studied psychology. Khalid is currently a graduate student at Northeastern University studying public policy.

Career 
Khalid worked for L.L.Bean making boots during high school and college. After graduating, she worked for the Maine Democratic Party as a field organizer in Lewiston. She later worked as a clerk for the Maine Legislature's Committee on Housing and Labor. She currently works as a case manager for the nonprofit Gateway Community Services in Maine.

Politics 
In 2017, Khalid ran for the Lewiston School Committee. She lost to the incumbent by a wide margin. Shortly after the election, she was elected as vice chair of the Lewiston Democratic Party.

In 2018, Khalid won a seat representing Androscoggin County on the Maine Democratic Party State Committee. She went on to be elected to the Maine Democratic Party Executive Committee.

In 2019, Khalid ran for the Lewiston City Council. On November 5, 2019, Khalid won the election with nearly 70 percent of the vote. Khalid took office on January 6, 2020. She serves on the Lewiston Finance Committee, Lewiston Housing Committee, and the Community Development Block Grant Committee.

Khalid served as vice chair of the Lewiston Democratic Party. She endorsed Bernie Sanders during the 2020 Democratic Party presidential primaries and served as one of his Maine co-chairs. After Sanders dropped out of the race, she endorsed Joe Biden.

In 2021, Khalid ran for chair of the Lewiston Democratic Party seeking to succeed outgoing Chair Kiernan Majerus-Collins. After facing hostility and racist comments at a party meeting, she withdrew from the race.

Election Results

References

1996 births
American people of Somali descent
American politicians of Somalian descent
American Muslims
Living people
Somalian emigrants to the United States
University of Southern Maine alumni
Lewiston, Maine City Council members
African-American women in politics
African-American people in Maine politics
Women city councillors in Maine
Lewiston High School (Maine) alumni
21st-century African-American people
21st-century African-American women